Cindy Lee Blodgett (born December 23, 1975) is a former collegiate and professional basketball player. She was also the head coach at University of Maine from 2007 to 2011. Blodgett attended Lawrence High School in Fairfield, Maine, where she was an all-star basketball player. She led the Bulldogs to a four-year career record of 84–4. Throughout that four-year period they won four state class A championships. Her tremendous accolades have made her a hero across the state of Maine.

Playing career 
Blodgett was a standout player for the women's basketball team at the University of Maine from 1994 to 1998. A four-time Kodak All-American, Blodgett became just the second woman in NCAA Division I history to lead the nation in scoring four consecutive seasons, averaging over 27 points per game in her sophomore and junior years at Maine. She finished her career with 3,005 points, breaking a total of 20 school records. Blodgett led Maine to its first four appearances in the NCAA basketball tournament in the school's history.

Blodgett earned a Bachelor of Science degree in elementary education from the University of Maine, graduating cum laude.

After graduation, she was selected by the Cleveland Rockers of the WNBA in the first round (#6 overall pick) of the 1998 WNBA draft.

After spending one season with the Rockers, Blodgett was traded to the Sacramento Monarchs, and spent three seasons with them after which she was released.

Blodgett also played for the Springfield Spirit in the National Women's Basketball League.

University of Maine statistics
Source

Coaching career 
Blodgett began her coaching career by serving as an assistant coach to the women's basketball team at Boston University during the 1999–2000 season. In 2003–04, she ran a summer skills basketball camp in her native Maine.  On September 30, 2005, Blodgett became an assistant coach at Brown University.

On June 28, 2005, her hometown of Clinton, Maine dedicated a public park in her honor.

On May 23, 2007, The University of Maine named her the new women's head basketball coach. She signed a four-year contract with her alma mater.

On September 21, 2010, Blodgett signed a two-year extension with the school that paid her $109,772 annually through the 2012–13 season. Her teams had compiled a 20–69 record over the first three years of her original contract.

On March 29, 2011, following a 4–25 season, Blodgett was released from her position as head coach.

After leaving the University of Maine, Blodgett spent three seasons as an assistant coach at the University of Rhode Island.

In 2014, she was hired by her former Sacramento Monarchs teammate, Kady Steding, to return as an assistant coach to Boston University. 

Blodgett is currently the Physical Education Department Head  at Lincoln School, a private girls school located in Providence, RI. Beginning with the 2019–2020 season, she will serve as the girls basketball coach.

See also
List of NCAA Division I women's basketball players with 3000 points

References

External links
 WNBA profile

1975 births
Living people
All-American college women's basketball players
American women's basketball coaches
American women's basketball players
Basketball coaches from Maine
Basketball players from Maine
Cleveland Rockers players
Maine Black Bears women's basketball coaches
Maine Black Bears women's basketball players
People from Kennebec County, Maine
Sacramento Monarchs players
Shooting guards